Aleuron carinata is a moth of the family Sphingidae. It was described by Francis Walker in 1856

Distribution 
Is known from southern Mexico, Panama, Venezuela, Brazil, Bolivia, Costa Rica, Belize and Ecuador.

Description 
The wingspan is 62–86 mm. Adults are on wing at least from July to January in Costa Rica and in June in Panama.

Biology 
The larvae feed on Doliocarpus dentatus, Curatella americana and probably other Dilleniaceae species.

References

Aleuron
Moths described in 1856
Moths of North America
Moths of South America